Li'l Missy Beaded Doll Kits were made in the early 1970s. The 6" tall doll had a dylite form body that required no sewing.
Each kits included pins, sequins, beads, colorful fabric, ribbons and trim. Other embellishments included flowers and fruit. There was a large variety of kits representing countries of the world, careers, holidays, birthdays, etc. These kits were a big hit with girls from ages 8 to 75. Additional accessories available were revolving plastic musical stands, plastic display domes and cardboard doll houses, some sold in a three doll package.

History
The Walco Bead Co. New York, N.Y..

Walco Dolls 1974-1976
 13301  ALICE BLUE GOWN
 13302  GOLDEN GIRL
 13303  SOUTHERN BELLE	
 13304  BRIDE	
 13305  SPRING BEAUTY	
 13306  MISS LIBERTY	
 13307  SENORITA	
 13308  BONNIE LASS	
 13309  COLLEEN	
 13310  LOTUS BLOSSOM
 13311  ROSE QUEEN	
 13312  CONTESSA	
 13313  SNOW QUEEN	
 13314  CHIQUITA (Some boxes labeled as "JUANITA")	
 13315  LAURA	
 13316  MICHELLE	
 13317  HEIDI	
 13318  NOELLE
 13331  GRETCHEN	
 13332  MAJORETTE	
 13333  RODEO QUEEN	
 13334  GRADUATE	
 13335  FARMERS DAUGHTER-(Also known as "SUNBONNET SUE")	
 13336  MARDI GRAS	
 13337  ?	
 13338  ?	
 13339  BLACK MAGIC
 13340	 BETSY ROSS
 13341	 MARTHA WASHINGTON
 13342	 PRISCILLA
 13343	 POCAHONTAS
 13344	 ANGEL
 13345	 SWEETHEART
 13346	 SUNSHINE BUNNY
 13346M SUNSHINE BUNNY w/MUSIC BOX
 13347	 HAPPY HOLIDAY
 13348	 ?
 13349	 ?
 13350	 3 DOLL BOXED SET - (contains Getchen, Gibson Girl and Madame DuBarry)
 13350A GIBSON GIRL
 13350B GRETCHEN
 13350C MADAME DUBARRY
 13351	 ?
 13352	 ?
 13353	 ?
 13354	 ?
 13355	 ?
 13356	 ?
 13357	 ORPHAN DENISE
 13358	 RUNAWAY DENISE
 13359	 ?
 13360	 3 DOLL BOXED SET - (contains Mother Goose, Little Bo Peep and Little Red Riding Hood)
 13360A LITTLE BO PEEP
 13360B MOTHER GOOSE
 13360C RED RIDINGHOOD
 13360D QUEEN OF HEARTS
 13360E ALICE IN WONDERLAND
 13360F MARY, MARY QUITE CONTRARY
 13361	 ?
 13361D HAPPY HOLLY
 13362	 ?
 13363	 GYPSY
 13364	 NUN-(Also known as "SWEET CHARITY")

Holiday Dolls 1976-1979
 13365	NURSE-(Also known as "CLARA")
 13366	GRANNY-(Also known as "NONI")
 13367	GIBSON GIRL
 13368	MADAME DUBARRY
 13369	??
 13370	??
 13371	MRS. SANTA
 13372	GAY 1990s
 13373	BALLERINA
 13374	SHIP AHOY
 13375	BRIDESMAID
 13376	PARTY TIME
 13377	CHRISTMAS GIRL
 13378	CHEERLEADER
 13379	HAREM GIRL
 13380	?
 13381	ALASKAN BEAUTY
 13382	TEACHER
 13383	MAID OF HONOR
 13384	?
 13385	HER ROYAL MAJESTY
 13386	CLOWN
 13387	TEACHER
 13388	SCARECROW
 13389	DEVIL
 13390	SLEEPY TIME
 13391	CINDERELLA BEFORE
 13392	CINDERELLA AT THE BALL
 13393	CINDERELLA'S FAIRY GODMOTHER
 13394	SPRINGTIME SALLY
 13395	SUMMERTIME SUE
 13396	AUTUMN ALICE
 13397	WINTERTIME WENDY
 13398	COUNTRY SINGER
 13399	GARDEN PARTY-(Also known as "APRIL SHOWERS")
 13400	CHEF
 13401	HAPPY BIRTHDAY
 13402	LI'L MOTHER
 13403	HAPPY ANNIVERSARY
 13404	MIMI AND FIFI
 13405	NEW BRIDE
 13406	ARTIST
 13407	PIRATE
 13408	MUSIC RECITAL-(Some boxes labeled as "MUSICAL RECITAL")
 13409	PLAYMATE
 13410	CROSSING GUARD
 13411	THE ENTERTAINER
 13412	LAVENDER AND LACE
 13413	STRAWBERRY FESTIVAL
 13414	PEPPERMINT CANDEE
 13415	CHRISTMAS DECORATING
 13416	SUN BONNET SUZY
 13417	CHERRY DELIGHT
 13418	SLEIGHRIDE
 13419	TRICK OR TREAT
 13420	TENNIS CHAMP
 13421	HER ROYAL HIGHNESS
 13422	GOLF CHAMP
 13423	VANITY FAIR
 13424	LUCKY RAINBOW
 13425	TO MARKET TO MARKET
 13426	SPRING CLEANING
 13427	CHATTERBOX
 13428	MEG/LITTLE WOMEN SERIES
 13429	JO/LITTLE WOMEN SERIES
 13430	AMY/LITTLE WOMEN SERIES
 13431	BETH/LITTLE WOMEN SERIES
 13432	?
 13433	HULA DANCER
 13434	?
 13435	CHRISTMAS CAROLLER
 13436	SOUTHERN BELLE
 13437	MR. SANTA
 13438	SHOW BOAT
 13439	GREEN LOLLY
 13440	CHOCOLATE KISS
 13441	CINNAMON DROP
 13442	LEMON DROP
 13443	VIOLET/FLOWER SERIES
 13444	BUTTERCUP/FLOWER SERIES
 13445	LILLY OF THE VALLEY/FLOWER SERIES
 13446	MOSS ROSE/FLOWER SERIES
 13447	BUTTERCUP/FLOWER SERIES
 13448	VIOLET/FLOWER SERIES
 13449	LILY OF THE VALLEY/FLOWER SERIES
 13450	JANUARY - GARNET
 13451	FEBRUARY - AMETHYST
 13452	MARCH - AQUAMARINE
 13453	APRIL -  DIAMOND
 13454	MAY - EMERALD
 13455	JUNE - PEARL
 13456	JULY - RUBY
 13457	AUGUST - PERIDOT
 13458	SEPTEMBER - SAPPHIRE
 13459	OCTOBER - PINK ZIRCON
 13460	NOVEMBER - TOPAZ
 13461	DECEMBER - TURQUOISE
 13478	TRAVELLER
 13479 LOTUS BLOSSOM 2
 13480 SCARLET O'HARA
 13901 PENNY CANDY SET (contains Green Lolly, Chocolate Kiss, Cinnamon Drop and Lemon Drop)
 13902 GRANNY'S GARDEN SET (contains Violet, Buttercup, Lily of the Valley and Miss Moss or Miss Rose)
 13903 ?
 13904	Pink Bird of Happiness
 13905	Yellow Bird of Happiness
 13906	Blue Bird of Happiness
 13907	Christmas Bird of Happiness
   ?   Snowball Fight

(incomplete listing)

References
 Beading History
 Walco Indian Beadcraft Kit

See also

 Bead
 Beadwork
 Glass beadmaking

Doll brands
Beadwork